Andrew Thomas Irvine (born April 9, 1969) is an American bassist who has toured with and performed alongside internationally recognized artists and has been featured in Bass Player magazine. Andy has toured with over 25 artists nationally and has delivered solid bass work contributions to over 50 successful albums, covering a wide range of styles.

He was raised in Webster, New York, and was active in the Rochester, New York, scene in his early days.

Irvine has performed in a number of bands, including the Tampa, Florida, outfits Beanstalk and Clang, the California group On the One, the Colorado ensembles the Jelly Roll Bakers and Huge in Germany, the band Giant People, and his own outfit the Andrew Irvine Group. He has played alongside GG Allin, Eden Brent, Pee Wee Ellis, Eddie Turner, John Wesley and Lucky Peterson. While with Clang, he recorded an album with Tiny Tim titled Prisoner of Love.

A Warwick artist, Irvine was featured in a March 2009 Bass Player article on soloing, in which the article called him a "soloing sensation." He was featured again in the magazine in August 2010 and twice in 2013 in Bass Guitar Magazine (UK).

Andy founded the Warwick "The Sound of Bass World Clinic Tour" visiting 20 countries around the world.

In 2009, he released a solo album titled Soul Clap and in 2011 another album titled "diggin' that funky blues."

In 2012 Andy was asked personally by FUNK icon Bootsy Collins to become a "professor" at his Funk University. Several of Andy's lessons and lectures are now part the Funk-U program, more educational segments are regularly being filmed in LA for ongoing use at Funk U.

In July 2013 Andy Irvine released his 3rd solo album "The Way I Like It" A complete departure from his previously released albums, it is a truly solo bass guitar feature album with a sparse and ambient production. The relaxed and easy going world music rhythms, and melodies take the listener to far away lands. His deep love of American blues and soul music are also evident and displayed throughout with warm soulful execution. All of the bass tracks were recorded completely live with no over dubs or layering. The 11 song collection of original compositions features the sounds of his custom Warwick 12 string bass guitar on 5 songs. This unique instrument has an angelic rich tone. The other 6 songs feature Irvine's flowing melodic style on the 4 string bass guitar. Also featured is accompaniment from world-renowned percussionist Gumbi Ortiz, known for his work as percussionist with Al Di Meola for well over 25 years.

"I set out to record and release a bass guitar feature album with a certain and strict criteria in mind, it had to sound like music and be a relaxed enjoyable listen from the beginning of the album to the end. I composed all the music to be melody and rhythm oriented, and to be "listenable" I did not want to create an album which displays tricky and impressive techniques, more so to provide a soulful collection of songs that might transport the listener to a pleasant place of relaxation. I'm proud of the finished work, and in ways it is my best to date" -Andy Irvine

References

Living people
Musicians from Rochester, New York
1969 births
People from Webster, New York
Guitarists from New York (state)
American male bass guitarists
20th-century American bass guitarists
20th-century American male musicians